William Stafford (1593–1684), was born in Norfolk, England and was an English landowner. He was the son of the conspirator William Stafford and his wife Anne Gryme.

He was the author of The Reason of the War, with the Progress and Accidents Thereof, Written by an English Subject which was published in 1646, which argued for Charles I to give more power to Parliament.

The Jacobite pamphleteer Richard Stafford was his grandson.

References

Notes

1593 births
1684 deaths
17th-century English writers
17th-century English male writers
English political writers
Writers from the Kingdom of England